The 2022 OFC U-19 Championship is an international football tournament being held in Tahiti from 7 to 24 September 2022 for under 19 players. The eleven national teams involved in the tournament were required to register a squad of up to 26 players, including two goalkeepers. Only players in these squads are eligible to take part in the tournament. The two finalists of the tournament qualify for the 2023 FIFA U-20 World Cup.

The position listed for each player is per the official squad list published by the OFC. The age listed for each player is on 7 September 2022, the first day of the tournament. The numbers of caps and goals listed for each player do not include any matches played after the start of tournament. The nationality for each club reflects the national association (not the league) to which the club is affiliated. A flag is included for coaches that are of a different nationality than their own national team.

Group A

American Samoa
 Coach: Ruben Luvu

Cook Islands
 Coach: Tahiri Elikana

New Zealand
The 26 man preliminary squad was announced by OFC on 27 August 2022. New Zealand Football announced their final 23 man squad on 1 September 2022.

 Coach:  Darren Bazeley

Solomon Islands
 Coach: Jerry Allen

Group B

Fiji
 Coach: Ronil Lal

Papua New Guinea
 Coach: Anthony Pakakota

Tahiti
 Coach: Bruno Tehaamoana

Tonga
 Coach: Timote Moleni

Group C

New Caledonia
 Coach: Pierre Wajoka

Samoa
 Coach:  Matt Calcott

Vanuatu
 Coach: Francois Sakama

References

OFC U-20 Championship squads
2022–23 in OFC football